1001 Vrouwen uit de Nederlandse geschiedenis is a compilation of 1001 biographies of famous women of the Netherlands spanning roughly 1700 years.

Project
The book is the result of a research project called the Digital Women's lexicon of the Netherlands (Digitaal Vrouwenlexicon van Nederland) led by Els Kloek. The biographies are presented in alphabetical order, and can also be viewed online. The breakdown of biographies per period according to the website (which is still growing) is as follows:

Over 300 writers contributed biographies. The historians Anna de Haas, Marloes Huiskamp, Els Kloek, and Kees Kuiken each wrote over 40 biographies, while nearly a third were the combined work of various editors. The book was designed by Irma Boom.

Gallery (by birth year)

Included persons
Some of the more prominent women included in the book are:

References

External links
 1001 Vrouwen uit de Nederlandse geschiedenis, book website
 Digitaal Vrouwenlexicon van Nederland 

2013 non-fiction books
Dutch biographical dictionaries